Karunaiyar  is a river flowing in the Tirunelveli district of the Indian state of Tamil Nadu.

References

See also 
 List of rivers of Tamil Nadu

Rivers of Tamil Nadu
Geography of Tirunelveli district
Rivers of India